Clifford Francis Brady (March 6, 1897 – September 25, 1974) was a second baseman in Major League Baseball who played for the Boston Red Sox in the 1920 season.  Brady batted and threw right-handed.  He was also an outstanding soccer forward in the St. Louis Soccer League.  He was born in St. Louis, Missouri.

Baseball
In a 53-game career, Brady posted a .228 batting average (41-for-180) with 16 runs, 12 RBI, five doubles, and one triple without home runs.

Following his major league career, Brady spent 14 seasons in the minors playing and managing.

Soccer
During the winters, Brady played soccer in the St. Louis Soccer League.  He was a member of St. Louis Scullin Steel F.C., which won the 1922 National Challenge Cup defeating Todd Shipyard of Brooklyn, 3–2. Allie Schwarz scored two of the Scullin goals and Brady had the other.  In the fall of 1922, he broke his leg and lost the entire season.  He was inducted into the St. Louis Soccer Hall of Fame in 1972.

Brady died in Belleville, Illinois, at the age of 77.

References

External links
1922 in American Soccer League
Baseball Reference
Retrosheet
The Sporting News

1897 births
1974 deaths
American soccer players
Major League Baseball second basemen
Boston Red Sox players
St. Louis Soccer League players
St. Louis Scullin Steel F.C. players
Baseball players from St. Louis
Soccer players from St. Louis
Association football forwards